Unc-13 homolog C (C. elegans) is a protein that, in humans, is encoded by the UNC13C gene.

References

Further reading